Patricia "Patty" Aakhus (May 17, 1952 – May 16, 2012), also known by her maiden name and pseudonym Patricia McDowell, was an American novelist and director of International Studies at the University of Southern Indiana. She specialized in Irish themes and won Readercon's Best Imaginative Literature Award in 1990 and the Cahill Award for The Voyage of Mael Duin's Curragh.

Early life and education
McDowell was born in Los Angeles in 1952 to Lowell and Betsy (née Nichols) McDowell, both of whom preceded her in death, as did a brother, Mark.
She earned a BA from the University of California, Santa Cruz, and an MFA from Norwich University.

Career
Her debut novel, The Voyage of Mael Duin's Curragh, is a retelling of the Irish legend of The Voyage of Máel Dúin. Other publications include Astral Magic in the Renaissance: Gems, Poetry and Patronage of Lorenzo de' Medici. Magic, Ritual and Witchcraft and the short story The Spy.

As educator
Aakhus was the Director of the Center for Interdisciplinary Studies and program director of International Studies at the University of Southern Indiana. She also taught classes on classical and world mythology, the history of magic, and international studies.

Death
She died from cancer in Evansville, Indiana on May 16, 2012, the day before her 60th birthday. She was survived by her husband, two children, three siblings, and other members of her extended family. At that time, she was working on a contemporary novel, Dogtown.

Bibliography
The Voyage of Mael Duin's Curragh (1990); 
Daughter of the Boyne (1992); 
The Sorrows of Tara (1995);

Notes

1952 births
2012 deaths
University of California, Santa Cruz alumni
University of Southern Indiana faculty
Writers from Los Angeles
20th-century American novelists
American humanities academics
Norwich University alumni
Deaths from cancer in Indiana
American women novelists
20th-century American women writers
Novelists from Indiana
American women academics
21st-century American women writers